Tulin is a village and a gram panchayat in the Jhalda I CD block in the Jhalda subdivision of the Purulia district in the state of West Bengal, situated beside the Subarnarekha River.

Geography

Location 
Tulin is a developed village, located in the border of West Bengal and Jharkhand. According to Census 2011 information the location code of Tulin village is 331279. It is situated 11.6 km away from sub-division Jhalda and 54.8 km away from district headquarter Purulia. The total geographical area of village is 761.94 hectares.

Area overview
Purulia district forms the lowest step of the Chota Nagpur Plateau. The general scenario is undulating land with scattered hills. Jhalda subdivision, shown in the map alongside, is located in the western part of the district, bordering Jharkhand. The Subarnarekha flows along a short stretch of its western border. It is an overwhelmingly rural subdivision with 91.02% of the population living in the rural areas and 8.98% living in the urban areas. There are 3 census towns in the subdivision. The map alongside shows some of the tourist attractions in the Ajodhya Hills. The area is home to Purulia Chhau dance with spectacular masks made at Charida. The remnants of old temples and deities are found in the subdivision also, as in other parts of the district.

Note: The map alongside presents some of the notable locations in the subdivision. All places marked in the map are linked in the larger full screen map.

Demographics
According to the 2011 Census of India, Tulin had a total population of 9,844 of which 5,054 (51%) were males and 4,790 (49%) were females. There were 1,222 persons in the age range of 0 to 6 years. The total number of literate people in Tulin was 6,602 (76.57% of the population over 6 years).

Transport
Tulin is the originating/ terminating point of the State Highway 4A running to Chas Morh.

Tulin is a station on the NSC Bose Gomoh-Hatia line of the South Eastern Railway.

References

Villages in Purulia district